Roger Gracie (born Roger Gracie Gomes; 26 September, 1981) is a Brazilian former professional mixed martial artist and 5th degree Brazilian jiu-jitsu (BJJ) practitioner and coach. 

The son of coral belt Mauricio Gomes and grandson of BJJ founder Carlos Gracie, Roger Gracie is one of jiu-jitsu's most decorated and accomplished athletes and considered by many as the greatest competitor in jiu-jitsu history.

A member of both IBJJF Hall of Fame and ADCC Hall of Fame, Gracie won 10 IBJJF world championship titles across multiple weight classes, every year from 2004 to 2010, becoming the first competitor to win the open weight division 3 times. He is also a two-time European Champion, and a Pan Champion. Gracie is an ADCC Submission Fighting weight, absolute, and superfight champion, the only athlete to win gold in both his weight class and the open weight division with a 100% submission-rate. Gracie retired in 2017 after defeating then BJJ world champion Marcus Buchecha, leaving jiu-jitsu without a single submission defeat in his record.

Competing concurrently in MMA, Gracie is the 2016 One World Cruiserweight Champion, a former Strikeforce and UFC middleweight contender, holding at the time of his retirement in 2017 a professional record of 8–2.

Early life 
Roger Gomes Gracie was born on 26 September 1981 in Rio de Janeiro, Brazil. From a very young age Gracie started training Brazilian Jiu-Jitsu.

Brazilian jiu-jitsu career

Early career 
During his teenage years, after training with his uncle Rilion Gracie, Gracie started competition. In 1999 he won the Brazilian National Jiu-Jitsu Championship fighting as blue belt in the middleweight division then the following year Gracie won the 2000 Pan American Championship followed by the  World Jiu-Jitsu Championship both in the medium-heavy blue belt division. That same year, 18-year-old Gracie was arrested by the Civil Police of Rio de Janeiro together with three other grapplers (Rafael Lima, Rafael Ramos and Murilo Carvalho), for allegedly shooting paintball and rubber bullets guns at three transvestites. Gracie was not prosecuted but the incident led his mother to send him to London to live with his father, who had moved to England to set up the first Gracie Barra academy in the UK.

Training in the UK with his father and in Brazil with his uncle Carlos Gracie, Jr., Gracie won another world championship title in 2001, this time as a purple belt, in the medium heavy division, under team Gracie Barra; Also in 2001 after receiving his brown belt he won the Brazilian Nationals for the second time. In 2002 as a brown belt Gracie won both the heavyweight division and the open class becoming double world champion for the first time. Competing at the 2003 ADCC Submission Fighting World Championship taking place for the first time in Sao Paulo on 17 May, Gracie arrived third in the - category, after defeating Mário Sperry and Rigan Machado but losing to John-Olav Einemo (2–0). In 2003 at age 22, Gracie received his black belt from his uncle Carlos Gracie Jr.

Black belt career 
In his first year as black belt Gracie won silver at the 2003 World Championship after losing by points to Márcio Cruz. In 2004 Gracie won the ADCC South American Trials held in Campos Brazil, winning both his weight class (-) and the open weight division with a 100% submission-rate.

2004–2005: First IBJJF titles, ADCC world double gold 
At the 2004 World Jiu-Jitsu Championship, Gracie won the super heavyweight division but lost the final of the Absolute in a controversial match, after his opponent  Ronaldo "Jacaré" Souza refused to tap out after getting armbared, got his arm dislocated as a result, then stayed away from Gracie with his broken left arm tucked into his belt, to keep his lead on points and win the match.

In May 2005 Gracie competed in the ADCC Submission Wrestling World Championship taking place at the Walter Pyramid in Long Beach California. Gracie won all 8 of his matches, both at the super heavyweight and at the absolute weight classes, submitting Ronaldo Souza with a rear naked choke from standing, becoming the first grappler in history to win both divisions after submitting every single opponents. That same year Gracie won the 2005 World Jiu-Jitsu Championship with silver in Absolute, then double gold at the 2005 European Open Championship winning the ultra heavyweight division and defeating Ronaldo Souza in the Absolute.

2006–2007: Pan Am champion, ADCC superfight champion 
In April 2006 competing at the Pan American Championship taking place at California State University , Gracie won silver in the super heavyweight division after losing by points to Xande Ribeiro, the fourth loss of his career; he then won gold in Absolute after submitting the same Ribeiro in a triangle within 30 seconds. Gracie won another world title in 2006, at the World Jiu-Jitsu Championship taking place in Rio de Janeiro, after defeating Robert Drysdale in the super heavyweight final, Gracie then won silver in Absolute, after losing by points against Xande Ribeiro, in the last few seconds of the fight;

In 2007 Gracie won both divisions, earning double world championship gold for weight and absolute, submitting all his opponents except Fernando Pontes "Margarida"; At the 2007 ADCC world championships in Trenton, New Jersey, Gracie fought and won by points, a superfight against Jon Olav Einemo, one of only four men who had managed to defeat him in the past, Gracie became in the process the first ADCC triple crown winner.

2008–2010: Tenth world title, retirement from competition 
The following year Gracie became the 2008 World Champion but lost the Absolute final against Xande Ribeiro after the clock ran out. At the 2009 World Championship Gracie submitted all of his opponents, in the super heavyweight and in the absolute weight class, with a "cross choke from mount", winning double gold again.

In 2010 Gracie fought his last world championship, Gracie won both divisions, winning 8 fights with a "choke from the back", defeating Ricardo Abreu by points in the Super Heavyweight final, and winning the Absolute without fighting, after Romulo Barral forfeited due to an injury. Gracie became the first athlete to win 3 Open weight titles at black belt level. Gracie announced leaving BJJ competition to focus on his mixed martial arts career.

Superfights

Gracie vs. Buchecha 
In 2012, Gracie returned to grappling competition for one night only at Metamoris 1, a submission only superfights event, to face Marcus 'Buchecha' Almeida "the new 22-year-old heavyweight jiu-jitsu sensation', the bout was ruled a draw, while the match, which lasted 20 minutes, was noted by some as "one of the greatest grappling matches ever recorded".

Gracie vs. Comprido 
In July 2015, having not competed jiu-jitsu in 5 years, Gracie returned to competitive grappling to face Rodrigo Comprido, at a superfight American Nationals event during the UFC Fan Expo, winning via armbar in about 4 minutes.

Gracie vs. Buchecha II 
On 23 July 2017, at Gracie Pro jiu-jitsu an event taking place at Carioca Arena 1 in Rio de Janeiro, Gracie faced Marcus "Buchecha" Almeida for a 15-minute superfight  dubbed "the most-anticipated rematch in jiu-jitsu history", at that point both fighters held 10 world championship titles and were considered the greatest competitors in the sport. In the five previous years Gracie only fought one match against Rodrigo Comprido while Buchecha fought seventy matches winning more world championship titles than any other fighter at the time. Gracie submitted Buchecha with a lapel choke at the 6:52 mark of the match, right after his win, Gracie announced his final retirement from BJJ competition.

Recognition 
Having never been submitted in 20 years of competition, holding 14 World Jiu-Jitsu Championship titles (10 as black belt), with three gold and five silver in the open weight division, Gracie is regarded by many as the greatest jiu-jitsu competitor of all time. In May 2014 he was inducted into the International Brazilian Jiu-Jitsu Federation Hall of Fame.

On 14 November 2021, Gracie became the first person to be inducted into the ADCC Hall of Fame, owing in part to his two gold medals at the 2005 ADCC world championship and his superfight victory in 2007. In July 2022 Gracie received his 5th Stripe on his BJJ black belt from his father, Mauricio Gomes.

Mixed martial arts career 
Gracie made his MMA debut in 2006, defeating veteran Ron Waterman by armbar submission in the 1st round at the Bodogfight pay-per-view USA vs Russia. On May 18, 2008, Gracie competed at Sengoku 2, where he defeated Yuki Kondo at 2:40 min of round 1 by rear naked choke.

2009–2012: Strikeforce 
Gracie announced at the December 19, 2009, Strikeforce Evolution show that he had signed a contract with Strikeforce to make his American MMA debut. On September 11, 2011, Gracie suffered his first MMA loss when he faced former Strikeforce light heavyweight champion Muhammed Lawal. Gracie was knocked out in the first round. Gracie made his middleweight debut against UFC veteran Keith Jardine at Strikeforce: Rockhold vs. Kennedy on July 14, 2012, winning the fight via unanimous decision. Gracie then won his next bout via submission defeating Anthony Smith at Strikeforce: Marquardt vs. Saffiedine

2013: Ultimate Fighting Championship 
On January 15, 2013, the UFC announced that Gracie would be one of 20 Strikeforce fighters folding into the organisation, making him the 4th member of the Gracie family to fight in the Ultimate Fighting Championship.

Gracie lost by unanimous decision to Tim Kennedy on July 6, 2013, at UFC 162. After the Kennedy fight his contract with the organisation expired and they chose not to renew it.

2014–2016: ONE Championship 
In August 2014, Gracie signed a multi-fight deal with Singapore based promotion ONE Championship. Gracie returned to the Light Heavyweight division, known as "Cruiserweight" on ONE, and in his debut faced James McSweeney at ONE FC 23: Warrior's Way on December 5, 2014. He won the fight via TKO in the third round.

On May 6, 2016, he defeated Michal Pasternak for the inaugural ONE FC Cruiserweight Championship, winning the bout by Arm Triangle in the first round.

On October 14, 2017 Gracie announced his retirement from MMA three months after retiring from Brazilian jiu-jitsu.

Business career

Roger Gracie Brazilian Jiu Jitsu Academy 
With the help of his father, 8th degree coral belt Maurício "Maurição" Motta Gomes, Roger established the Roger Gracie Academy in 2004 in Ladbroke Grove, London. Notable Black belt promotions include Raymond Stevens, Nicolas Gregoriades and Kywan Gracie Behring.

Personal life 
Gracie and his wife have a son and daughter named Tristan & Maya.

Championships and accomplishments

Brazilian jiu-jitsu / Submission wrestling 
Main Achievements (Black Belt):
 10 x IBJJF World Champion (2004 / 2005 / 2006 / 2007 / 2008 / 2009/2010)
 2 x IBJJF Pan American Champion (2006)
 2 x IBJJF European Open Champion (2005)
 2nd Place IBJJF World Championship (2003/2004/2005/2006/2008)
 2nd Place IBJJF Pan Championship (2006)
Submission wrestling:
 2 x ADCC Submission Fighting World Champion (2005)
 ADCC Superfight Champion (2007)
 3rd Place ADCC Submission Fighting World Championship (2003)

Main Achievements (Coloured Belts):
 4 x IBJJF World Champion (2000 blue, 2001 purple, 2002 brown)
 2 x Brazilian National Champion (1999 blue / 2001 brown)

Mixed martial arts 
 ONE Light Heavyweight World Championship (2016, Former)

Career records

Brazilian jiu-jitsu / Submission wrestling record 

|-
|align="center" style="background: #f0f0f0"| Record
| align="center" style="border-style: none none solid solid; background: #f0f0f0"|Result
| align="center" style="border-style: none none solid solid; background: #f0f0f0"|Opponent
| align="center" style="border-style: none none solid solid; background: #f0f0f0"|Method
| align="center" style="border-style: none none solid solid; background: #f0f0f0"|Event
| align="center" style="border-style: none none solid solid; background: #f0f0f0"|Date
| align="center" style="border-style: none none solid solid; background: #f0f0f0"|Round
| align="center" style="border-style: none none solid solid; background: #f0f0f0"|Time
| align="center" style="border-style: none none solid solid; background: #f0f0f0"|Notes
|-
|67–7–1
|Win|| Marcus Almeida|| Submission (choke from the back) || Gracie Pro SUPERFIGHT|| 2017 || || 6min 52s ||Super Fight
|-
|66–7–1
|Win|| Rodrigo Medeiros|| Submission (Armbar) || 2015 IBJJF Black Belt League Super Fight (UFC Fan Expo) || 2015 || align=center|1 || 4min 25s || Super Fight
|-
|65–7–1
|Draw|| Marcus Almeida|| Decision || Metamoris|| 2012|| align=center|1|| 20:00 ||
|-
|65–7
|Win|| Romulo Barral || Forfeit (Injury) || World Jiu-Jitsu Championship (Absolute Division)|| 2010|| || || Final
|-
|64–7
|Win|| Ricardo "Demente" Abreu|| Points (13–2)|| World Jiu-Jitsu Championship (Super Heavyweight Division)|| 2010|| || || Final
|-
|63–7
|Win|| Walter Vital|| Submission (Choke from Mount) || World Jiu-Jitsu Championship(Super Heavyweight Division) || 2010|| || ||
|-
|62–7
|Win|| Bruno Bastos|| Submission || World Jiu-Jitsu Championship(Super Heavyweight Division) || 2010|| || ||
|-
|61–7
|Win|| Luiz Fernando|| Submission (Choke) || World Jiu-Jitsu Championship(Super Heavyweight Division) || 2010|| || ||
|-
|60–7
|Win|| Tarsis Humphreys|| Submission || World Jiu-Jitsu Championship(Absolute Division) || 2010|| || ||
|-
|59–7
|Win|| Rodrigo Cavaca|| Submission (Armbar) || World Jiu-Jitsu Championship(Absolute Division) || 2010|| || ||
|-
|58–7
|Win|| Diego Herzog|| Submission (Choke) || World Jiu-Jitsu Championship(Absolute Division) || 2010|| || ||
|-
|57–7
|Win|| Frost Murphy|| Submission (Choke) || World Jiu-Jitsu Championship(Absolute Division) || 2010|| || ||
|-
|56–7
|Win|| Romulo Barral|| Submission (Cross Choke from mount) || World Jiu-Jitsu Championship (Absolute Division)|| 2009|| || || Final
|-
|55–7
|Win|| Ricardo "Demente" Abreu|| Submission (Cross Choke from mount) || World Jiu-Jitsu Championship (Super Heavyweight Division)|| 2009|| || || Final
|-
|54–7
|Win|| Claudio Calasans|| Submission || World Jiu-Jitsu Championship (Absolute Division)|| 2009|| || ||
|-
|53–7
|Win|| Rafael Lovato Jr.|| Submission || World Jiu-Jitsu Championship (Absolute Division)|| 2009|| || ||
|-
|52–7
|Win|| Bernardo Faria|| Submission || World Jiu-Jitsu Championship (Super Heavy)|| 2009|| || ||
|-
|51–7
|Win|| Bruno Bastos|| Submission || World Jiu-Jitsu Championship (Super Heavy)|| 2009|| – YouTube || ||
|-
|50–7
|Loss|| Alexandre Ribeiro|| Points (4–2) || World Jiu-Jitsu Championship (Absolute Division)|| 2008|| || || Final
|-
|50–6
|Win|| Leonardo Leite|| Submission (Cross Choke from mount) || World Jiu-Jitsu Championship (Super Super Heavyweight Division)|| 2008|| || || Final
|-
|49–6
|Win|| Eduardo Telles|| Advantage || World Jiu-Jitsu Championship || 2008|| || ||
|-
|48–6
|Win|| Luigi Mondelli|| Submission || World Jiu-Jitsu Championship || 2008|| || ||
|-
|47–6
|Win|| Rodrigo Cavaca|| Submission || World Jiu-Jitsu Championship || 2008|| || ||
|-
|46–6
|Win|| Jon Olav Einemo|| Points (5–0) || ADCC Submission Wrestling World Championship (Superfight)|| 2007|| || || Superfight
|-
|45–6
|Win|| Romulo Barral|| Submission (Cross Choke from mount) || World Jiu-Jitsu Championship (Absolute Division)|| 2007|| || || Final
|-
|44–6
|Win|| Robert Drysdale|| Submission || World Jiu-Jitsu Championship (Absolute Division)|| 2007|| || || Semi-final
|-
|43–6
|Win|| Robert Drysdale|| Submission || World Jiu-Jitsu Championship (Super Heavyweight Division)|| 2007|| || || Final
|-
|42–6
|Win|| Fernando "Margarida" Pontes|| Points || World Jiu-Jitsu Championship || 2007|| || ||
|-
|41–6
|Win|| Tim Carpenter|| Submission || World Jiu-Jitsu Championship || 2007|| || ||
|-
|40–6
|Win|| Rodrigo Cavaca|| Submission || World Jiu-Jitsu Championship || 2007|| || ||
|-
|39–6
|Win|| Adriano Camolesi|| Submission || World Jiu-Jitsu Championship || 2007|| || ||
|-
|38–6
|Win|| Rodrigo Medeiros|| Submission || World Jiu-Jitsu Championship || 2007|| || ||
|-
|37–6
|Loss|| Alexandre Ribeiro|| Points || World Jiu-Jitsu Championship (Absolute Division)|| 2006|| || || Final
|-
|37–5
|Win|| Robert Drysdale|| Submission (Cross Choke from mount) || World Jiu-Jitsu Championship (Super Heavyweight Division)|| 2006|| || || Final
|-
|36–5
|Win|| Marcelo Garcia|| Submission || World Jiu-Jitsu Championship || 2006|| || ||
|-
|35–5
|Win|| Rodrigo Cavaca|| Submission || World Jiu-Jitsu Championship || 2006|| || ||
|-
|34–5
|Win|| Pedro Schmall|| Submission || World Jiu-Jitsu Championship || 2006|| || ||
|-
|33–5
|Win|| Rodrigo Medeiros|| Submission || World Jiu-Jitsu Championship || 2006|| || ||
|-
|32–5
|Win|| Zumbi Machado|| || World Jiu-Jitsu Championship || 2006|| || ||
|-
|31–5
|Win|| Alexandre Ribeiro|| Submission (Triangle) || Pan American Jiu-Jitsu Championship || 2006|| || || Absolute Final
|-
|30–5
|Loss|| Alexandre Ribeiro|| Advantage || Pan American Jiu-Jitsu Championship|| 2006|| || || Weight Final
|-
|30–4
|Win|| Tiago Gaia|| Submission || Pan American Jiu-Jitsu Championship || 2006|| || ||
|-
|29–4
|Win|| Raphael Lovato Jr.|| Submission || Pan American Jiu-Jitsu Championship || 2006|| || ||
|-
|28–4
|Win|| Joao Silva|| Submission || Pan American Jiu-Jitsu Championship || 2006|| || ||
|-
|27–4
|Loss|| Ronaldo Souza|| Points (2–0) || World Jiu-Jitsu Championship (Absolute Division)|| 2005|| || || Final
|-
|27–3
|Win|| Alexandre Ribeiro||Points (12–2)|| World Jiu-Jitsu Championship (Super Heavyweight Division)|| 2005|| || || Final
|-
|26–3
|Win|| Fernando "Margarida" Pontes|| Submission || World Jiu-Jitsu Championship || 2005|| || ||
|-
|25–3
|Win|| Saulo Ribeiro||Submission|| World Jiu-Jitsu Championship || 2005|| || || Semi-final
|-
|24–3
|Win|| Ronaldo Souza||Points || European Open Championship (Absolute Division)|| 2005|| || || Final
|-
|23–3
|Win|| Roberto Abreu||Submission || European Open Championship || 2005|| || ||
|-
|22–3
|Win|| Rodrigo Solueo||Submission || European Open Championship || 2005|| || ||
|-
|21–3
|Win|| Ronaldo Souza|| Submission (Rear Naked Choke) || ADCC Submission Wrestling World Championship (Absolute Division)|| 2005|| || || Final
|-
|20–3
|Win|| Alexandre Ribeiro|| Submission (Rear Naked Choke) || ADCC Submission Wrestling World Championship (Absolute Division)|| 2005|| || || Semi-final
|-
|19–3
|Win|| Fabrício Werdum|| Submission (Rear Naked Choke) || ADCC Submission Wrestling World Championship (Absolute Division)|| 2005|| || || Quarter-final
|-
|18–3
|Win|| Shinya Aoki|| Submission (Foot Lock) || ADCC Submission Wrestling World Championship (Absolute Division)|| 2005|| || || Elimination Round
|-
|17–3
|Win|| Alexandre Ferreira|| Submission (Quit on Stool) || ADCC Submission Wrestling World Championship (88–98 kg Division)|| 2005|| || || Final
|-
|16–3
|Win|| Alexandre Ribeiro||Submission (Rear Naked Choke) || ADCC Submission Wrestling World Championship (88–98 kg Division)|| 2005|| || || Semi-final
|-
|15–3
|Win|| Eduardo Telles||Submission (Armbar) || ADCC Submission Wrestling World Championship (88–98 kg Division)|| 2005|| || || Quarter-final
|-
|14–3
|Win|| Justin Garcia|| Submission (Rear Forearm Choke) || ADCC Submission Wrestling World Championship (88–98 kg Division)|| 2005|| || || Elimination Round
|-
|13–3
|Loss|| Ronaldo Souza|| Points || World Jiu-Jitsu Championship (Absolute Division)|| 2004|| || || Final
|-
|13–2
|Win|| Rodrigo Medeiros||Submission (Rear Naked Choke) || World Jiu-Jitsu Championship (Super Heavyweight Division)|| 2004|| Roger Gracie vs Rodrigo Medeiros || || Final
|-
|12–2
|Win|| Fernando "Tererê" Augusto|| Submission (Choke from Mount) || World Jiu-Jitsu Championship || 2004|| || ||
|-
|11–2
|Win|| Marcelo Garcia|| Points || World Jiu-Jitsu Championship (Absolute Division) || 2004 || || ||
|-
|10–2
|Win|| Recardo Franco|| Submission || World Jiu-Jitsu Championship (Super Heavy) || 2004 || || ||
|-
|9–2
|Win|| Roberto Agnese|| Submission || World Jiu-Jitsu Championship (Absolute Division) || 2004 || || ||
|-
|8–2
|Win|| Leonardo Ramos|| Submission || World Jiu-Jitsu Championship (Absolute Division) || 2004 || || ||
|-
|7–2
|Loss|| Marcio Cruz|| Points (3–0) || World Jiu-Jitsu Championship (Absolute Division)|| 2003|| || || Final
|-
|7–1
|Win|| Alexandre Ribeiro|| || ADCC Submission Wrestling World Championship (88–98 kg Division)|| 2003|| || || Third place match
|-
|6–1
|Loss|| Jon Olav Einemo|| || ADCC Submission Wrestling World Championship (88–98 kg Division)|| 2003|| || || Semi-final
|-
|6–0
|Win|| Rigan Machado|| || ADCC Submission Wrestling World Championship (88–98 kg Division)|| 2003|| || || Quarter-final
|-
|5–0
|Win|| Mario Sperry|| || ADCC Submission Wrestling World Championship (88–98 kg Division)|| 2003|| || || Elimination Round
|-
|4–0
|Win|| Marcio Corleta|| Points || || ?|| || ||
|-
|3–0
|Win|| Demian Maia|| Points || Brazilian Teams Championship || 2002|| || || Roger: Brown Belt, Demian: Black Belt
|-
|2–0
|Win|| Ronaldo Souza|| || World Jiu-Jitsu Championship (Absolute Division) || 2002|| || || Brown Belt Final Match
|-
|1–0
|Win|| Rodrigo Asmus|| || World Jiu-Jitsu Championship (Heavyweight Division) || 2002|| || || Brown Belt Final Match
|-

Mixed martial arts record 

|-
| Win
| align=center| 8–2
| Michal Pasternak
| Technical Submission (arm-triangle choke)
| ONE: Ascent to Power
| 
| align=center| 1
| align=center| 2:13
| Kallang, Singapore
| 
|-
| Win
| align=center| 7–2
| James McSweeney
| TKO (front kick and punches)
| ONE FC: Warrior's Way
| 
| align=center| 3
| align=center| 3:15
| Pasay, Philippines
| 
|-
| Loss
| align=center| 6–2
| Tim Kennedy
| Decision (unanimous)
| UFC 162
| 
| align=center| 3
| align=center| 5:00
| Las Vegas, Nevada, United States
|
|-
| Win
| align=center| 6–1
| Anthony Smith
| Submission (arm-triangle choke)
| Strikeforce: Marquardt vs. Saffiedine
| 
| align=center| 2
| align=center| 3:16
| Oklahoma City, Oklahoma, United States
|
|-
| Win
| align=center| 5–1
| Keith Jardine
| Decision (unanimous)
| Strikeforce: Rockhold vs. Kennedy
| 
| align=center| 3
| align=center| 5:00
| Portland, Oregon, United States
| 
|-
| Loss
| align=center| 4–1
| Muhammed Lawal
| KO (punches)
| Strikeforce: Barnett vs. Kharitonov
| 
| align=center| 1
| align=center| 4:33
| Cincinnati, Ohio, United States
|
|-
| Win
| align=center| 4–0
| Trevor Prangley
| Submission (rear-naked choke)
| Strikeforce: Diaz vs. Cyborg
| 
| align=center| 1
| align=center| 4:19
| San Jose, California, United States
|
|-
| Win
| align=center| 3–0
| Kevin Randleman
| Submission (rear-naked choke)
| Strikeforce: Heavy Artillery
| 
| align=center| 2
| align=center| 4:10
| St. Louis, Missouri, United States
| 
|-
| Win
| align=center| 2–0
| Yuki Kondo
| Submission (rear-naked choke)
| World Victory Road Presents: Sengoku 2
| 
| align=center| 1
| align=center| 2:40
| Tokyo, Japan
|
|-
| Win
| align=center| 1–0
| Ron Waterman
| Submission (armbar)
| BodogFight: USA vs. Russia
| 
| align=center| 1
| align=center| 3:38
| Vancouver, British Columbia, Canada
|

Instructor lineage 
Kanō Jigorō → Mitsuyo Maeda → Carlos Gracie Sr. → Helio Gracie → Carlos Gracie Jr. → Roger Gracie

Notes

See also 
 List of Brazilian Jiu-Jitsu practitioners

References

External links 

 
 

1981 births
Living people
Brazilian male mixed martial artists
Light heavyweight mixed martial artists
Heavyweight mixed martial artists
Mixed martial artists utilizing Brazilian jiu-jitsu
Mixed martial artists utilizing Muay Thai
Sportspeople from Rio de Janeiro (city)
Brazilian people of Scottish descent
Brazilian expatriate sportspeople in England
Roger
People awarded a black belt in Brazilian jiu-jitsu
Brazilian Muay Thai practitioners
Ultimate Fighting Championship male fighters
World Brazilian Jiu-Jitsu Championship medalists
IBJJF Hall of Fame inductees
ADCC Hall of Fame inductees
ONE Championship champions
Brazilian jiu-jitsu practitioners who have competed in MMA (men)